A Trip to Wiesbaden is a 1989 Soviet drama film directed by Yevgeni Gerasimov.

Plot 
Dmitry Sanin goes to Frankfurt, where he meets the daughter of a coffee house owner named Gemma, whom she falls in love with. This feeling is mutual and they decide to start a family. For this, Sanin sells his small estate to the wife of his friend, Maria. And suddenly he realizes that Gemma is not at all the one he had been looking for all his life...

Cast 
 Sergey Zhigunov
 Yelena Seropova
 Natalya Lapina
 Zinoviy Gerdt
 Zeinab Botsvadze
 Vyacheslav Molokov		
 Yevgeny Gerasimov
 Vladimir Shevelkov	
 Artur Vardanyan
 Anatoli Shalyapin

References

External links 
 

1989 films
1980s Russian-language films
Soviet comedy-drama films
1989 comedy-drama films